The Sankei Sho All Comers (Japanese オールカマー) is a Grade 2 horse race for Thoroughbreds aged three and over run in September over a distance of 2,200 metres at Nakayama Racecourse.

It was first run in 1955 and was promoted to Grade 3 in 1984 when its distance was increased from 2000 metres. The race was elevated to Grade 2 class in 1995. The race often serves as a trial race for the autumn edition of the Tenno Sho. Winners of the race have included Oguri Cap, Shonan Pandora and Rey de Oro.

Winners since 2000 

 The 2002 and 2014 races took place at Niigata Racecourse.

Earlier winners

 1984 - Asaka Silver
 1985 - Asaka Silent
 1986 - Jusaburo
 1987 - Dyna Fairy
 1988 - Suzu Parade
 1989 - Oguri Cap
 1990 - Racket Ball
 1991 - George Monarch
 1992 - Ikuno Dictus
 1993 - Twin Turbo
 1994 - Biwa Hiyahide
 1995 - Hishi Amazon
 1996 - Sakura Laurel
 1997 - Mejiro Dober
 1998 - Daiwa Texas
 1999 - Hokkai Rousseau

See also
 Horse racing in Japan
 List of Japanese flat horse races

References

Turf races in Japan